Yuxi railway station is a railway station in Hongta District, Yuxi, Yunnan, China.

History
Prior to opening, the station was known as Yuxi West. On 16 November 2016, the station was renamed Yuxi. The station formerly named Yuxi was simultaneously renamed Yuxi West railway station. Yuxi railway station opened on 15 December 2016. Simultaneously, Yuxi West railway station was closed to passengers.

The Yuxi–Mohan railway was opened on December 3, 2021.

References 

Railway stations in Yunnan
Railway stations in China opened in 2016